Yadanabon was the first chief queen consort of King Narathihapate of Pagan Dynasty of Burma (Myanmar). She was a granddaughter of King Kyaswa and Queen Saw Mon Hla, and a niece of Queen Thonlula. Note that the royal chronicles do not mention her as a queen at all; instead, they mention her sister Saw Hla Wun, who later became famous as Pwa Saw, as the only chief queen. But inscriptional evidence shows that Yadanabon was the first chief queen, and that Hla Wun became the chief queen only in 1262, following Yadanabon's death.

References

Bibliography
 
 

Chief queens consort of Pagan
1262 deaths
13th-century Burmese women